Daedalus Project is a brand of high-performance and competition skydiving parachutes designed and manufactured by New Zealand manufacturer NZ Aerosports Ltd, for the sport of Canopy piloting.

History

The Daedalus Project brand was launched in 2005 with the release of the Daedalus JVX. The company develops high-performance canopies for canopy pilots for use in competitions. While still in the prototype stage the JVX took first place at the inaugural US nationals of Canopy piloting in 2004 flown by Jim P. Slaton. Since then NZ Aerosports Ltd have continued to develop the performance of the JVX, as well as developing several other varieties of canopy.

Products

The Daedalus Project range consists of seven models, two of which are special order items only available on application and one of which is a Speedflying specific canopy. The JVX, JFX, Leia, Petra and Sofia are a mix of everyday high-performance swooping wings and hyper performance competition wings. The Matrix2 is a competition specific Canopy Relative Work canopy. The GLX was developed for a non-skydiving discipline called Speedflying or bladerunning, which involves flying a parachute down a slope close to the ground. All these parachutes are currently available at NZ Aerosports Ltd.

Daedalus JVX

The JVX is a 27-cell elliptical cross braced Tri-cell, with a nose modification, different trim, longer lines and no stabilizers.

The JVX is an update from the Icarus EXTreme VX released by NZ Aerosports in 1999. It incorporates an upgraded trim and is designed specifically for rear riser flight.

NZ Aerosports discovered stabilizers on small high-performance canopies didn’t do much other than flap in the wind and cause added parasitic drag. The Daedalus Project first dealt with the issue of reducing drag on the wing tips by developing ram-air stabilizers. They quickly found that no stabilizers were even better! The stabilizers primary function is to hold the slider in the correct position during deployment. They addressed this issue by putting slider stops on the canopy itself allowing them to get rid of the stabilizers all together.

Daedalus Project also pioneered the use of a new parachute fabric called sail fabric (used commonly in the paragliding and Speedflying industries) on the JVX. Sail fabric has less porosity and holds a better shape, making the wing more efficient.

Daedalus JFX

The JFX is a 21-cell Elliptical ZP Crossbraced canopy. While the JVX was shaped for swooping power and CP competition, the JFX is made to be a high-end everyday swooping canopy.

The JFX is fully crossbraced, has a long recovery arc and powerful bottom end, but is advertised to have Crossfire-like openings that are more hassle free than traditional high performance canopies.

NZ Aerosports recommends loading the JFX at 1.8 and above, and markets it to the already experienced elliptical 9-cell jumper.

Daedalus JPX Petra

Petra is said to be the result of over 25 years of parachute design experience at NZ Aerosports and their 2010-2011 R&D Project called the Summer of Love. NZ Aerosports released her as the first ever hyper-performance competition parachute.

According to reports, she was designed by French Aerodynamics Engineer Julien Peelman and NZ Aerosports owner Paul Martyn, using state of the art Computational Fluid Dynamics technology. CFD uses the computer modeling of airflow to analyze and predict the performance of a canopy’s shape.

The design uses a similar standard to the JVX in terms of distortion reduction with crossbraces and 27 cells but that’s where the similarity ends. 

It has a highly elliptical planform and very high sweep. NZ Aerosports say she has a high roll rate, a long recovery arc and high maximal glide ratio. She is said to deliver unrivalled power in the turn, plane out and flare.

Petra has a long list of World Records, National and International titles to back that up. She had an impressive debut at the PD Big Boy Pants event in July 2011, with Nick Batsch setting a new distance world record of 222.45 m (729 ft). One month later Nick took out the Pink Open in Klatovy and the FAI World Cup also; first in distance, speed and overall. He also won the 2011 US CP nationals on Petra.

Patrick Boulongne came 2nd in the European Championships and 6th overall at the World Cup with Petra in his first competition with her. He went on to win the 2011 French Canopy Piloting Nationals.
Brice Bernier won the 2011 Italian CP Nationals on her, and came 2nd in the 2011 French CP nationals behind Patrick Boulongne.
Since then Nick Batsch has set 5 more World Distance Records flying Petra. The current one is 169.19m run set at the 5th FAI World parachuting Championships at Z-hills Florida.

Daedalus JPX Leia

Leia is a 21-chamber 7-cell crossbraced ZP wing designed to bring Petra technology to a wider market. She was made for the everyday experienced swooper.

Leia has advanced panel shaping and the late-generation planform that was pioneered with Petra. She is highly elliptical, has optimized wing tips and NZ Aerosports signature Powerband nose.

She is available in two options: Standard ZP and Hybrid construction. Standard configuration has a small pack volume and no special care instructions. Hybrid versions internal structures are made from sail fabric (polyurethane coated nylon) to make the wing more rigid and are made to cater for the pilot who wants an everyday and competition canopy.

Daedalus JPX Sofia

Sofia is NZ Aerosports’ latest addition to the Daedalus Project range, and is only available to their sponsored athlete network and proven canopy piloting competitors under application.

She is a 27-chamber, 9-cell crossbraced competition canopy designed specifically for the Speed discipline of canopy piloting. Like Leia, she is a derivation of Petra. She features a new shaped Powerband leading edge.

Daedalus Matrix2
The Daedalus Matrix2 is a 5-cell competitive CF canopy using crossbraced technology with fewer lines. 
NZ Aerosports say the wing revolutionizes the idea of how a CRW canopy should land. It’s said to have tons of flare even on straight in approaches. The rears have much range, are easy to land with and give you another powerful tool to use in the air.

Aussie CRW Team Ookoonono do 270 to 630 approaches with the wing and say they land almost as well as a crossbraced sports canopy.
The trim is not set too steep but the reduced drag still means that the Matrix2 dives more than a 7-Cell. The result is that the wing can be flown efficiently with a small amount of brakes and just needs to be released to accelerate.

Daedalus GLX
The GLX is a canopy developed specifically for the Speedflying discipline, also known as ground launching or bladerunning. It is completely cross braced, with a hybrid nose section. The center three cells of the canopy are open and the cells on each side of the center are closed with opening similar to a JVX. The GLX has no stabilizers, has reinforced ribs and uses Sail cloth. Sail material has been used for years on ram air kites and paragliders. It is crisp and thick allowing it to hold the aerofoil’s shape better, it makes launching easier and it is more rigid during flight. The GLX comes standard with two HMA or Vectran line sets.
As an option, pilots can get a continuous line set allowing broken lines to be easily changed in the field without tools. A continuous line set makes losing a line during flight less stressful, since you have more attachment points between you and the canopy.

Marketing
NZ Aerosports has an extensive sponsorship program of competitive canopy pilots and instructors flying Daedalus Project parachutes. At the top of the game is pilot Nick James Batsch who won Distance world Records on the JVX, and more recently set six new Distance World records on Petra.

NZ Aerosports most notable online campaign featuring Daedalus Project canopies was the ‘Summer of Love’ video campaign in 2011-2012. It featured test-jumping videos from their R&D project that led to the development of Petra and gave skydivers around the world an insight into how they developed new canopies. Each prototype was named after a businesswoman or actress (porn star or prostitute) and featured photos of them next to the canopy. In many ways this campaign put them on the map and led their way into the big boys league with industry giant, Performance Designs.

The latest marketing campaign for Daedalus Project canopies has been the release of the Daedalus JPX Leia. NZ Aerosports revisited the Summer of Love themed videos by introducing Bridget and Candy, the two prototypes leading up to the final product. They started a web based countdown page to her release that went viral and caught the entire world wide skydiving scene’s interest. Following the infamous ‘girly’ theme  and sex appeal started with the original videos, they coined the line ‘Fall in Love’ for Leia’s release, and punctuated ads with plays on wedding vows.

References

Parachuting